Danilo Zavoli (born 1 April 1973) is a Sammarinese swimmer. He competed in two events at the 1992 Summer Olympics.

References

1973 births
Living people
Sammarinese male swimmers
Olympic swimmers of San Marino
Swimmers at the 1992 Summer Olympics